Blackballed may refer to:
 Blackballed (band), a UK rock band from Manchester.
 Blackballed: The Bobby Dukes Story, a 2004 comedy film.

See also 
 Blackball (disambiguation)
 Blackballing, a rejection in a traditional form of secret ballot, where a black ball signifies opposition.